José Antonio Medeiros (born March 19, 1970) is a Brazilian politician. He had represented Mato Grosso in the Federal Senate from 2015 to 2019 and is currently member of the Chamber of Deputies.  He is a member of the Liberal Party (PL).

Personal life
Medeiros is a devout member of the Presbyterian church.

Political career
Medeiros voted in favor of the impeachment against then-president Dilma Rousseff. Medeiros voted in favor of the 2017 Brazilian labor reform, and would later back Rousseff's successor Michel Temer against a similar corruption investigation and impeachment motion.

References

1970 births
Living people
People from Rio Grande do Norte
Brazilian Presbyterians
Liberal Party (Brazil, 2006) politicians
Members of the Federal Senate (Brazil)
Members of the Chamber of Deputies (Brazil) from Mato Grosso